Every Saturday (1866–1874) was an American literary magazine published in Boston, Massachusetts. It was edited by Thomas Bailey Aldrich and published by Ticknor and Fields (1866–1868); Fields, Osgood, & Co. (mid-1868–1870); James R. Osgood & Co. (1871–1873); and H. O. Houghton & Co. (1874).

Every Saturday featured work by C. G. Bush, Wilkie Collins, F. O. C. Darley, Charles Dickens,  J.W. Ehninger, Sol Eytinge Jr., Harry Fenn, Alfred Fredericks, Thomas Hardy, J.J. Harley, W.J. Hennessy, Winslow Homer, Augustus Hoppin, Ralph Keeler, S.S. Kilburn, Granville Perkins, W.L. Sheppard, Alfred Tennyson, Alfred Waud and others.

Gallery

References

External links

 Hathi Trust. Every Saturday; a journal of choice reading
 New York Public Library. Digital Gallery items related to the magazine
 https://openlibrary.org/books/OL14007192M/Every_Saturday


19th century in Boston
1866 establishments in Massachusetts
1874 disestablishments in Massachusetts
Weekly magazines published in the United States
Cultural history of Boston
Defunct literary magazines published in the United States
Magazines disestablished in 1874
Magazines established in 1866
Magazines published in Boston